Shekiban is a community in Afghanistan, approximately  west of Herat.

See also
Herat Province

References

Populated places in Herat Province